Saint Dalmatius may refer to:

Dalmatius of Constantinople (d. 440 AD), saint venerated in Constantinople
Dalmatius of Pavia (d. 254 or 304 AD), venerated as a saint by the Roman Catholic Church
Dalmatius of Rodez, bishop of Rodez from 524 to 580